Giuseppe Sciacca (born 23 February 1955) is the current Secretary of the Supreme Tribunal of the Apostolic Signatura since his appointment by Pope Francis on July 16, 2016, replacing the retiring Archbishop Frans Daneels. Previously, he had served as Adjunct Secretary of the Apostolic Signatura, since Saturday, 24 August 2013. Previously, he had been serving as the Secretary General of the Governatorate of Vatican City State since his appointment by Benedict XVI on 3 September 2011.

Biography
Sciacca was born in Catania, Italy.  After having completed his initial theological studies in Catania he was sent to Rome for further studies.  Sciacca is an alumnus of the Pontifical University of St. Thomas Aquinas Angelicum where he earned a degree in canon law.  He later obtained a degree in philosophy from the University of Catania. He was ordained on 7 October 1978, belonging to the clergy of the Diocese of Acireale, in addition to pastoral ministry carried out in the Collegiate Church of St. Sebastiano in Acireale, has taught Philosophy and History at the State High Schools and canon law at the Theological Institute of Acireale.

After being appointed as defender of the Bond and Promoter of Justice in the Diocesan and Regional Tribunals of Sicily, has been appointed Judge at the same court in Palermo Regional Siculus. On 25 March 1999 he was appointed as a Prelate Auditor of the Tribunal of the Roman Rota. Sciacca is a well-known scholar of the history of the liturgy and of the figure of Pius XII. But he is also a popular Latin scholar.

On 18 February 2010, the remains of Cardinal Pompedda were reinterred in a specially constructed sarcophagus in the cathedral of Ozieri at the chapel of the Most Holy Sacrament. The requiem mass was celebrated at 5 p.m., presided by Bishop Sergio Pintor of Ozieri. At the end of the mass, Mgr Sciacca, judge of the Roman Rota and a long time collaborator of Cardinal Pompedda, read a special message sent for the occasion by Tarcisio Cardinal Bertone, S.D.B., secretary of State, in the name of Pope Benedict XVI.

On 3 September 2011 he was appointed Titular Bishop of Victoriana and at the same time Secretary-General of the Governatorate of Vatican City State. In this new role he will assist incoming president, Archbishop Giuseppe Bertello in charge of many of the City State’s departments such as its police, observatory, museums, post office and tourist information service.

On 8 October 2011, Sciacca received episcopal consecration from Tarcisio Cardinal Bertone, SDB along with Barthélemy Adoukonou, secretary of the Pontifical Council for Culture. On 13 February 2013, two days after the Pope announced his intention to resign, Pope Benedict appointed Bishop Sciacca to the post of Auditor General of Apostolic Camera.

References

External links

Living people
21st-century Italian titular bishops
Pontifical Lateran University alumni
Pontifical University of Saint Thomas Aquinas alumni
1955 births
Bishops appointed by Pope Benedict XVI